Fayrouz Aboelkheir (born 4 March 2006) is an Egyptian squash player. She won the Egyptian Challenger Tour #1 professional tournament.

References

Living people
Egyptian female squash players
2006 births
21st-century Egyptian women